MCFC may refer to:

 Manchester City F.C., a football club in England
 Melbourne City FC, a football club in Australia, sharing ownership with Manchester City
 Memphis City FC, a football club in the United States of America, named after Manchester City though sharing no ownership with it
 Molten carbonate fuel cell
 Mother City F.C., a defunct football club in South Africa
 Mumbai City FC, a football club in India, sharing ownership with Manchester City